Cacotheline is an organic compound with the chemical formula C21H21N3O7.  It is a nitro derivative of brucine obtained by reaction of brucine with nitric acid.  It is used as an indicator in the titrimetric analysis of tin ions (Sn2+).

References

Nitro compounds
Glycine receptor antagonists